Timberline is an alternate term for the tree line.

It may also refer to:

Places
 Timberline Lodge, a National Historic Landmark mountain lodge and ski area in Oregon, U.S.
 Timberline Lodge ski area, the ski area surrounding the lodge

Products
 Timberline Software, owned by Sage Group since September 2003

Schools
 Timberline High School (Boise, Idaho)
 Timberline High School (Weippe, Idaho)
 Timberline High School (Lacey, Washington)

See also
 Timberlane (disambiguation)